Anne-Marie Demortière (born 27 January 1938) is a French gymnast. She competed in six events at the 1960 Summer Olympics.

References

1938 births
Living people
French female artistic gymnasts
Olympic gymnasts of France
Gymnasts at the 1960 Summer Olympics
Sportspeople from Le Creusot
20th-century French women